Duplex (released in the United Kingdom and Ireland as Our House and in Poland as The Old Lady Must Go) is a 2003 American black comedy film directed by Danny DeVito (who also narrated the film) and written by Larry Doyle. The film stars Ben Stiller and Drew Barrymore with Eileen Essell, Harvey Fierstein, Robert Wisdom, Justin Theroux and James Remar in supporting roles.

Plot
Young, professional New York couple 
Alex Rose and Nancy Kendricks, are in search of their dream home. The seemingly perfect Brooklyn brownstone duplex has one flaw: Mrs. Connelly, an old Irish lady who lives on the rent-controlled top floor. Assuming she won't live long, they buy the apartment.

However, they soon realize Mrs. Connelly is lively, enjoys blasting her TV 24-7 and rehearsing in a brass band. A novelist, Alex must finish his latest against a looming deadline. However, he is interrupted constantly daily by Mrs. Connelly, and it quickly escalates into an all-out war. They try to get her to move out, but she refuses. Next, they try to file a noise complaint against her, but discover that she has gone to the police first and filed a harassment charge against them. Their friends turn against them when she play-acts as the "poor, innocent, old lady" making it appear they are out to harm her.

Nancy loses her job and Alex misses his deadline thanks to the old lady's antics, so they are trapped at home together with Mrs. Connelly with no place to go. Their rage turns to homicidal fantasy as they plot ways to get rid of their manipulative, no-good neighbor. Peace overtures and a break-in lead to nothing, so they hire a hitman, Chick, to kill her. His asking price for the hit is $25,000. Desperate and needing the money in two days, they sell almost everything they own to pay for the Christmas Eve hit.

Chick breaks into Mrs. Connelly's apartment as planned, but fails to kill her as she defends herself with a speargun, shooting him in the shoulder. She is incapacitated in the fight, and the duplex catches fire. Nancy and Alex appear to leave her to die, but then return and save her and her parrot. The fire department puts out the fire. Accepting defeat, Alex and Nancy leave, and find out the old woman has just died. Moving away, they contemplate their strange encounter.

We then learn they are not the first to be elaborately scammed by: the realtor of the duplex, Kenneth (Mrs. Connelly's son); the ill-tempered NYPD Officer Dan (Kenneth's boyfriend) who had frequently harassed and distrusted the couple, always siding with Mrs. Connelly in her disputes against them, and Mrs. Connelly herself (who is not in fact dead).

The real-estate scam has been run by the trio for several years: Kenneth sells the ground-floor apartment to an unsuspecting, naive young couple. Then Mrs. Connelly, aided by Dan, harasses them, eventually forcing them to move out. Finally, she fakes her own death so they will never suspect a thing, thus leaving them to collect and live off of the sales commission from the next unsuspecting occupants. Alex and Nancy were their latest victims among many. Despite everything, as they celebrate their latest victory, she admits she actually liked Alex and Nancy and hopes they find success and happiness elsewhere.

A final voice-over by Alex relates that he and Nancy relocated to The Bronx. Like the other couples the trio scammed, they never saw Mrs. Connelly or returned to Brooklyn again. Alex used their unpleasant experience as inspiration for his next book entitled Duplex, which became a best-seller, rescuing him and Nancy from poverty and giving the film a semi-happy ending.

Cast
 Ben Stiller as Alex Rose
 Drew Barrymore as Nancy Kendricks
 Eileen Essell as Mrs. Connelly
 Harvey Fierstein as Kenneth
 Justin Theroux as Coop
 James Remar as Chick
 Robert Wisdom as Officer Dan
 Swoosie Kurtz as Jean
 Wallace Shawn as Herman
 Maya Rudolph as Tara
 Amber Valletta as Celine
 Michelle Krusiec as Dr. Kang
 Tracey Walter as Pharmacy Customer
 Danny DeVito as Narrator (voice) (Uncredited)

Reception
Duplex has a 50/100 on Metacritic and a 35% approval rating on Rotten Tomatoes. The site's consensus states: "It was funnier when it was called Throw Momma from the Train."  Roger Ebert of the Chicago Sun-Times gave the film two stars out of four and wrote that the "murder schemes aimed at Mrs. Connelly don't generate the laughter they should, maybe because no matter what she does, she still seems, irremediably, unredeemably, a sweet little old lady. [...] 'Duplex' is all about plotting; it tries to impose emotions that we don't really feel. We can't identify with Mrs. Connelly, that's for sure, but we can't identify with Alex and Nancy, either, because we don't share their frustration -- and the reason we don't is because we don't believe it. There's too much contrivance and not enough plausibility, and so finally we're just enjoying the performances and wishing they'd been in a more persuasive movie."

Barrymore earned a Golden Raspberry Award nomination for Worst Actress for her performances in both Duplex and Charlie's Angels: Full Throttle, but lost to Jennifer Lopez for Gigli.

On a US $40 million budget, it grossed $9,692,135 in the US and $19,322,135 worldwide.

References

External links

 
 
 
 
 

2003 films
2003 black comedy films
American black comedy films
American crime comedy films
2000s English-language films
Films about writers
Films set in Brooklyn
Films set in New York City
Flower Films films
Films directed by Danny DeVito
Films produced by Ben Stiller
Films produced by Drew Barrymore
Films with screenplays by Larry Doyle
Miramax films
Red Hour Productions films
2003 comedy films
Films about Irish-American culture
2000s American films